Sweet myrtle is a common name for several plants and may refer to:

Acorus calamus, an herbaceous wetland plant with a broad distribution in the northern hemisphere
Myrtus communis, a shrub native to southern Europe